Dredge or dredging may refer to:

The arts
 Dredg, an American rock band
 Dredger (comic character), tough Dirty Harry-type cop in the Action comic-book series

Excavation
 Dragline excavator, a tool for dredging in mining; piece of heavy equipment used to remove overburden in an open pit or strip mine
 In the case of gold placer mining, a dredge is used to pick up ore and gravel, send it through sluices to remove gold, and deposit the remaining rock, or tailings, behind the dredge
 Dredging, underwater excavation work

Fishing
 Fishing dredge, a type of dredge used to harvest mollusks
 Marine biology dredge, a device used to sample organisms living on the bottom of a body of water

Other
 Bradley Dredge (born 1973), European Tour golfer who helped Wales win the World Cup of Golf 
 Data dredging, the inappropriate use of statistics that concentrates on local irregularities
 Dredge (agriculture), a mixture of barley and oats planted together used in brewing or as food for humans or livestock; notable for being planted in medieval Europe
 Dredge (cooking), to coat a food with a dry ingredient (such as flour or icing sugar) by first immersing it in a wet coating, such as milk or egg
 Dredging (astronomy), a process in stellar evolution in which heavier elements produced via fusion in the interior of stars are brought to the surface through convection